Thecla Åhlander (3 June 1855 – 8 April 1925) was a Swedish stage and film actress whose career began on the stage in the late 19th century and lasted through the early 1920s.

Early life and stage career
Åhlander was born Thekla Ottilia Åhlander in Norrköping and initially studied drama as pupil of Frans Hedberg in 1872. She continued her studies at the Royal Dramatic Theatre School from 1874 to 1877. She made her stage debut at the Royal Dramatic Theatre in 1877 in a play titled Ett namn. She was engaged at the theatre until 1922 and from 1908 to 1915 was also a drama teacher at the theatre. Åhlander became one of Scandinavia's premier stage actresses, appearing in roles by Henrik Ibsen, Bjørnstjerne Bjørnson, Ludvig Holberg, August Blanche, Axel Emil Betzonich, amongst others. She became the theatre's premier actress in 1888 and received the Litteris et Artibus in 1891.

Film career
Åhlander also appeared in three Swedish silent films in the early 1920s; Gunnar Klintberg's 1921 Elisabet, Mauritz Stiller's 1923 Gunnar Hedes saga and Victor Sjöström's 1923 The Hell Ship (Swedish: Eld ombord).

References

External links

Svenska Filminstitutet
Idun, 7 April, 1893

1855 births
1925 deaths
People from Norrköping
Swedish stage actresses
Swedish film actresses
Swedish silent film actresses
19th-century Swedish actresses
20th-century Swedish actresses
Litteris et Artibus recipients